Acoustics is an acoustic EP from Minus the Bear. It was released on October 7, 2008, through Tigre Blanco Records. It contains an unreleased track, "Guns & Ammo", and acoustic versions of six tracks previously released in electric versions on Highly Refined Pirates, Menos el Oso, and Planet of Ice.

Track listing

Personnel
 Jake Snider – Vocals, Guitar
 Dave Knudson – Guitar
 Erin Tate – Drums, Percussion
 Cory Murchy – Bass
 Alex Rose – Keyboards, Vocals

Production
Produced by Minus the Bear and Matt Bayles
Recorded and Mixed by Matt Bayles
Mastered by Chris Common
Additional recording by Jake Snider and Alex Rose

References

2008 EPs
Minus the Bear albums